Several books, films and other works about Bobby Fischer have been created.  Bobby Fischer (March 9, 1943 – January 17, 2008) was an American chess prodigy who rose to prominence during the 1950s and 1960s.  In 1972, Fischer defeated the Soviet player Boris Spassky to become world champion.  Soviet players had dominated chess for several years before Fischer's championship, a trend which continued after 1975 when Fischer refused to defend his title.  Fischer's participation in the 1972 championship match increased American interest in chess, in the context of the Cold War.

Works about Fischer divide into several genres.  In chess literature, several books have analyzed important games of his career, such as the Game of the Century, an early  won by Fischer when he was 13 years old.  In the immediate aftermath of Fischer's 1972 championship, several books appeared which were exclusively devoted to analysis of the match's 21 games.  Fischer's own work includes My 60 Memorable Games, a well-regarded analysis of his own games, and (with co-authors) Bobby Fischer Teaches Chess, a popular primer intended for absolute beginners.

Fischer has been the subject of several biographies, with some focusing on his psychology.  Fischer was known as an eccentric and "difficult" person, a reputation which informed the biographies and film accounts of his life.  The film Pawn Sacrifice dramatized Fischer's life and performance in the 1972 championship, depicting him using the archetype of the tortured genius.

Books

The bibliography is given in APA style.

A
 Agur, Elie. (1992). Bobby Fischer: His Approach to Chess. Cadogan Chess. .
 Alban, Albert. (2015). Chess tactics for beginners from the games of Bobby Fischer. Amazon Digital Services LLC.
 Alburt, Lev. (2003). Three Days With Bobby Fischer and Other Chess Essays: How to Meet Champions & Choose Your Openings. .
 Alexander, C.H.O'D. (1972). Fischer v. Spassky. Vintage Books. .

B
 Benson, Harry. (2011). Bobby Fischer. powerHouse Books. .
 Bernstein, Jeremy. (2012). Mostly He Won: Kubrick, Bobby Fischer, and the Attractions of Chess. Amazon Digital Services LLC.
 Bohm, Hans and Jongkind, Kees. (2005). Bobby Fischer: The Wandering King. Batsford. .
 Brady, Frank. (1989). Bobby Fischer: Profile of a Prodigy. Dover Publications. .
 Brady, Frank. (2012). Endgame: Bobby Fischer's Remarkable Rise and Fall. Broadway Books. .
 Burger, Robert E. (2011). The Chess of Bobby Fischer. Ishi Press reprint. .
 Byrne, Robert and Nei, Iivo. (2013). Both Sides of the Chessboard: An Analysis of the Fischer/Spassky Chess Match. Ishi Press reprint. .

D
 Darrach, Brad. (1974). Bobby Fischer Vs the Rest of the World. Stein & Day Pub. .
 Davies, Nigel. (1992). Bobby Fischer: The Five Million Dollar Comeback. Everyman Chess. .
 Denker, Arnold. (2009). The Bobby Fischer I Knew and Other Stories. Ishi Press reprint. .
 Donaldson, John. (2020). Bobby Fischer and His World. Silman-James Press, Inc. .
 Donaldson, John and Tangborn, Eric. (2017). Bobby Fischer: The Early Years: 1943 - 1962. Amazon Digital Services LLC.
 Donaldson, John and Tangborn, Eric. (2017). Collected Annotations and Articles by Bobby Fischer. Amazon Digital Services LLC.
 Donaldson, John. (2005). A Legend on the Road: Bobby Fischer's 1964 Simultaneous Exhibition Tour. Russell Enterprises. .
 Donaldson, John and Tangborn, Eric. (1999). The Unknown Bobby Fischer. International Chess Enterprises. .

E
 Edmonds, David and Eidinow, John . (2004). Bobby Fischer Goes to War: How the Soviets Lost the Most Extraordinary Chess Match of All Time. HarperCollins Publishers. . 
 Euwe, Max. (2011). Bobby Fischer – The Greatest?. Ishi Press reprint. .
 Euwe, Max. (1977). Bobby Fischer and His Predecessors in the World Chess Championship. HarperCollins Publishers. .
 Euwe, Max and Timman, Jan. (2009). Fischer World Champion: The Acclaimed Classic About the 1972 Fischer-Spassky Match. New In Chess. .
 Evans, Larry and Smith, Ken. (1973). Chess World Championship 1972: Fischer vs. Spassky. Simon & Schuster. .

F
 Fine, Reuben. (2008). Bobby Fischer's Conquest of the World Chess Championship: The Psychology and Tactics of the Title Match. Ishi Press reprint. .
 Fischer, Bobby. (2016). Checkmate: Bobby Fischer's Boys' Life Columns. Russell Enterprises, Inc. 
 Fischer, Bobby. (2008 reprint). Bobby Fischer's Games of Chess. Ishi Press. .
 Fischer, Bobby, et al. (1966). Bobby Fischer Teaches Chess. Basic Systems, Inc. New York City. 
 Fischer, Bobby. (1969). My 60 Memorable Games. Simon & Schuster.  New York City. .

G
 Geuzendam, Ten and Jan, Dirk. (2015). Finding Bobby Fischer. New In Chess. 
 Gligorić, Svetozar. (1973). Fischer vs. Spassky: Chess Match of the Century. Simon & Schuster. . 
 Gufeld, Eduard. (2001). Bobby Fischer: From Chess Genius to Legend. Thinkers' Press. .

H
 Hays, Lou. (1995). Bobby Fischer: Complete Games of the American World Chess Champion. Hays Pub. .

K
 Kasparov, Garry et al. (2005). Garry Kasparov on Fischer: Garry Kasparov On My Great Predecessors, Part 4. Everyman Chess. .
 Khmelnitsky, Igor. (2009). Chess Exam: You vs. Bobby Fischer: Matches Against Chess Legends: Play the Match, Rate Yourself, Improve Your Game!. Chess Exams. .

L
 Lakdawala, Cyrus. (2016). Fischer: Move by Move. Everyman Chess. .

M  
 Mednis, Edmar. (1974). How to Beat Bobby Fischer. Random House. .
 Müller, Karsten. (2010). Bobby Fischer: The Career and Complete Games of the American World Chess Champion. Russell Enterprises Inc. .

O
 Olafsson, Helgi. (2012). Bobby Fischer Comes Home: The Final Years in Iceland, a Saga of Friendship and Lost Illusions. New In Chess. .

P
 Pandolfini, Bruce. (1985). Bobby Fischer's Outrageous Chess Moves. Simon & Schuster. .
 Plisetsky, Dmitry and Voronkov, Sergey. (2005). Russians v Fischer. Everyman Chess. 
Ponterotto, Joseph G. (2012). A Psychobiography of Bobby Fischer: Understanding the Genius, Mystery, and Psychological Decline of a World Chess Champion. Charles C Thomas Pub Ltd. .
 Powell, Paul. (2013). Bobby Fischer 60 More Memorable Games. CreateSpace Independent Publishing Platform. .

R
 Roberts, Richard. (1973). Fischer/Spassky: The New York Times Report on the Chess Match of the Century. Times Books. .

S
 Sanchez, Miguel et al. (2020). Fischer in Cuba: Vol I. The Bowker Team. 
 Sanchez, Miguel et al. (2020). Fischer in Cuba: Vol II. Obispos. 
 Schiller, Robert. (2009). Learn from Bobby Fischer's Greatest Games. Cardoza. .
 Seirawan, Yasser with Stefanovic, George. (1992). No Regrets: Fischer–Spassky 1992. International Chess Enterprises. .
 Soltis, Andrew. (2003). Bobby Fischer Rediscovered. Batsford. .
 Stankovic, Nenad. (2012). The Greatest Secret of Bobby Fischer. CreateSpace Independent Publishing Platform. .
 Steiner, George. (1974). Fields of Force: Fischer and Spassky at Reykjavik. Viking Press. 

T
 Taimanov, Mark. (2021). I was a Victim of Bobby Fischer. Quality Chess. 
 Timman, Jan. (2021). The Unstoppable American: Bobby Fischer’s Road to Reykjavik. New In Chess. 
 Tsvetkov, Lyudmil. (2021). Bobby Fischer for Buffs. Independently published. 

V
 Verwer, Renzo. (2010). Bobby Fischer for Beginners: Most Famous Chess Player Explained. New in Chess. .

W
 Wade, Robert Graham and O'Connell, Kevin. (2009). The Complete Games of Bobby Fischer. Ishi Press. .

Articles
 Nicholas, Peter and Benson, Clea. (2003). Life is not a board game. The Philadelphia Inquirer.
 (2019). American Chess Magazine #12: Bobby Fischer Legend Lives On. pays tribute to the 50th anniversary of My 60 Memorable Games.
 Norman, Brendan. (2014). Bobby Fischer: Beautiful Chess Games, Weird Stuff and Cool Articles.

Documentaries
 Bio. Bobby Fischer, Biography.
 Chapa, Damian (Director). (2009). Bobby Fischer Live. Biography - Drama. United States: Amadeus Pictures.
 Garbus, Liz (Director). (2011). Bobby Fischer Against the World, Biography. United States: HBO Documentary Films.
 Gudmundsson, Fridrik (Director). (2009). Me and Bobby Fischer, Biography. Iceland.
 Moss, Todd (Writer). (2004). Bobby Fischer. Biography. United States: Actuality Productions.
 Zwick, Edward. (2015). Pawn Sacrifice''. Biography - Drama. United States: Gail Katz Productions.

References

External links
A few tributes to Robert James Fischer
"Books about Fischer and Kasparov" by Edward Winter
 Wikiquote: Bobby Fischer

Works about Bobby Fischer
Works about men
Bibliographies of people